The Stainless Steel Rat Gets Drafted is a novel by Harry Harrison published in 1987.

Plot summary
The Stainless Steel Rat Gets Drafted is a novel in which the master-criminal's revenge plans involve him joining an army.

Reception
Dave Langford reviewed The Stainless Steel Rat Gets Drafted for White Dwarf #95, and stated that "Very much the mixture as before."

Reviews
Review by L. J. Hurst (1988) in Vector 142

References

1987 novels